"Atom Age Vampire In 308" is the second single by the Japanese horror punk band Balzac. Released through the MCR Company, it was sold in at least five different versions of color sleeve, each one in a limited quantity. The band made a promotional cassette for the record.

Track listing
"Atom-Age Vampire In 308"
"Day The Earth Caught Fire"
"Fiendish Ghouls"
"Eerie Night"

Credits
 Hirosuke - vocals
 Atsushi - guitar, vocals, chorus
 Anti - bass guitar, chorus
 Naoki - drums, chorus

References

External links
Official Balzac Japan site
Official Balzac USA site
Official Balzac Europe site

1995 singles
Balzac (band) songs
1995 songs